Aarma or Äärma is an Estonian surname. Notable people with the surname include:
 Eevald Äärma (1911–2005), Estonian pole vaulter
 Jüri Aarma (1951–2019), Estonian actor, musician and stage actor
 Kiur Aarma (born 1975), Estonian television journalist

Estonian-language surnames